Baby Glacier is a glacier located in the U.S. state of Montana in Glacier National Park. Between 1966 and 2005, Baby Glacier lost a third of its surface area.

See also
 List of glaciers in the United States
 Glaciers in Glacier National Park (U.S.)

References

Glaciers of Flathead County, Montana
Glaciers of Glacier National Park (U.S.)
Glaciers of Montana